"The Bridge Is Over" is a 1987 song by Boogie Down Productions from their debut album Criminal Minded, performed by rapper KRS-One and produced by DJ Scott LaRock and KRS-One. The song's intro samples "The Bridge" by MC Shan.

History
It is considered to be a classic diss song, aimed at MC Shan, Marley Marl, the Juice Crew and rappers from Queens, NY and the Queensbridge projects.

It, and from the same album, "South Bronx",  are the most famous songs of The Bridge Wars between rappers from the Bronx and Queens.

The song's lyrics at the end are set to the tune of the famous Billy Joel song "It's Still Rock and Roll to Me":

"The Bridge is Over":

The song went on to become one of the most sampled hip hop songs in hip hop history.

Legacy and influence
The song was sampled in MC Ren's song "Final Frontier", from his 1992 EP Kizz My Black Azz.
The song was sampled in Rihanna's single "If It's Lovin' That You Want".
The song was sampled in 50 Cent's song "Da Heatwave".
The song was sampled in Queensbridge native Nas's song "Destroy & Rebuild."  "The Bridge Is Over" is heavily alluded to as Nas argues that the Bridge is not in fact "over" throughout the song.
The song's instrumental was used in the film Get Rich or Die Tryin', starring 50 Cent, which a young Marcus is rapping over the beat.
A pitch-shifted version of the song is used in Coldcut's seminal entry in the Journeys by DJ series.
The song was sampled by Pusha T and Kendrick Lamar in the song "Nosetalgia"
 The Impeach snare was used in "Creep" by TLC.
 The drum break was sampled in "Car Thief" by The Beastie Boys on their album Paul's Boutique.

See also 
List of notable diss tracks

References

External links
 

1987 songs
KRS-One songs
Answer songs
Diss tracks
Songs written by KRS-One
Songs written by Scott La Rock
Songs written by Billy Joel